Joshua Demers is a Canadian film director and screenwriter. He is most noted for his debut feature film Québexit, for which he, Gail Maurice and Xavier Yuvens won the Borsos Competition award for Best Screenplay in a Canadian Film at the 2020 Whistler Film Festival.

Born in Cold Lake, Alberta, to a francophone father and an anglophone mother, he is currently a production manager with Insight Productions.

He previously directed the short films Lead Us Not Into Temptation (2008), The Architect (2009), Norma Jeane and the Tropic of Cancer (2012) and Emily (2014), and the web series Kristal Clear. In 2022, he was producer of the web series Lady Ada's Secret Society.

References

External links

21st-century Canadian screenwriters
21st-century Canadian male writers
Canadian male screenwriters
Film producers from Alberta
Franco-Albertan people
Film directors from Alberta
People from Cold Lake, Alberta
Living people
Year of birth missing (living people)